, also known as Smile at the Runway, is a Japanese manga series written and illustrated by Kotoba Inoya. It was serialized in Kodansha's Weekly Shōnen Magazine from May 2017 to July 2021, with its chapters collected in twenty-two tankōbon volumes. Kodansha USA digitally published the manga in North America. An anime television series adaptation by Ezo'la aired from January to March 2020 on the Animeism programming block.

Summary 
The story follows two teenagers, Ikuto Tsumura and Chiyuki Fujito, who both have dreams of making it in the fashion world despite their circumstances. Chiyuki dreams of becoming a model and participating in the Paris Fashion Week. However, people make fun of her dreams because she is too short, despite having a thin and voluptuous figure. Ikuto wants to become a fashion designer thanks to his sewing skills. However, his family is poor.

An opportunity arises when Hazime Yanagida notices Ikuto's skill at sewing, offering him a part-time job at his fashion studio. Ikuto accepts this offer so he can support his family. Meanwhile, Chiyuki's father asks Ikuto to become her partner since they are both classmates and he wants Chiyuki to follow her dreams despite her height. They are joined by the famous but shy model Kokoro Hasegawa, who has a height complex, and prodigy fashion designer Toh Ayano, who considers Ikuto to be his rival. Chiyuki and Ikuto must work together in order to make their dreams come true.

Characters

Protagonists

Ikuto is a seventeen-year-old aspiring fashion designer. Ikuto has aspired to be a fashion designer from a young age, but he is forced put his dream on halt due to his family's financial struggles. As the eldest child and only son, Ikuto helps his mother take care of his sisters and handles most of the housework and initially refuses to go to college, planning to pursue full-time employment to support his sisters. After befriending Chiyuki and getting a part-time job at Yanagida's studio, Ikuto begins working towards his dream of being a fashion designer, though his financial situation causes him some setbacks. Despite this, he never gives up and supports them, wanting to become fashion designer for Chiyuki and his family in the future. Ikuto later develops feelings for Chiyuki.

Chiyuki is a seventeen-year-old model for her father's company Mille Neige. While blessed with good looks, the proper body proportions, and her father's connections and wealth, Chiyuki lacks the minimum height requirement to be a runway model, being 158cm (5'2") tall. Despite this, Chiyuki dreams of participating in the Paris Fashion Week as the representative of her father's company and aims to be a top model, regardless of her short height and what other people thinks of her. Chiyuki later develops feelings for Ikuto.

 
Kokoro is an aspiring, hard-working fashion designer, a first-year student at the Geika Institute of Fashion, and a part-time model at the agency Bon Rouge. Being 181cm (5'11") tall with a shy, submissive, and meek personality, she is self-conscious about her height, though she becomes less bothered by it when she was scouted in high school. Despite being talented as a model, Kokoro dislikes certain aspects of the job, but her feelings of debt toward her manager Igarashi and her lack of confidence prevent her from quitting. 

Toh is the 22-year-old adopted child of the famous designer Mai Ayano and Ikuto's rival. He is originally from France and was an orphan who lived on the streets until he was two years old. Having been personally trained by Mai for over twenty years, Toh is a prodigious fashion designer and patternmaker, and is considered the greatest senior student during his time at the Geika Institute of Fashion.

Others

Yanagida is a talented up-and-coming designer of his eponymous brand that caters to women and Ikuto's mentor and first employer. While pleasant and cordial around his customers, Yanagida is sharp-tongued, abrasive, foul-tempered, and arrogant, traits that often leave negative impressions on other people. However, Yanagida is frank and attentive, and sees potential in Ikuto, helping him understand what it means to be a designer. 
 

Fujito is the founder and president of the modeling agency and up-and-coming brand Mille Neige, and Chiyuki's father. Fujito deeply loves Chiyuki and named his company after her ("Mille Neige" and "Chiyuki" both mean "Thousand Snow" in French and Japanese, respectively) when it was established. A fair yet practical man, he has great faith in Chiyuki's talent as a model, but he never shows her any favoritism.

Shizuku is a model for Mille Neige and is famous for being the first model from the company to walk the runway in the prestigious Paris Fashion Week show. Having known Chiyuki since she was young, Shizuku is Chiyuki's role model, friend, and mentor, and she loves her like a little sister. However, Shizuku is also blunt and realistic about Chiyuki's chances of becoming a top model.

Igarashi is Kokoro's manager and an agent from the modeling agency Bon Rouge. Igarashi is a former model and Shizuku's friend and colleague, having worked with her at Bon Rouge as teenagers. 

Kaoru is a second-year student at the Geika Institute of Fashion who specializes in women's fashion and is a fan of Yanagida. Having worked as a dresser during Yanagida's first fashion show, Kaoru develops a fierce, one-sided rivalry and envy towards Ikuto after seeing him step up to the pressure of modifying one of Yanagida's dresses for Chiyuki. 

Ryūnosuke is a second-year student at the Geika Institute of Fashion who specializes in men's fashion and is Kaoru's childhood friend. Confident and disliking elite privilege, Ryūnosuke is competitive and aims to surpass those who are better than him, such as Toh. 

Takaoka is the Headmaster of the Geika Institute of Fashion and takes great pride in her school. Behind her preppy and happy-go-lucky demeanor, Takaoka has a sharp eye and is supportive of all her students, including Ikuto, whom she greatly encourages to attend the school to nurture his talent.

Seira is Japan's most famous model and a TV celebrity who is responsible for starting Ikuto's path toward being a designer and reigniting Chiyuki's modeling career after posting a picture of Chiyuki wearing Ikuto's dress on her social media. Despite being 171cm (5′7″), which is considered to be short for a runway model, Seira is able to keep her balance and perform on the runway no matter how high her heels are. While Seira behaves in a cheerful and air-headed manner, she actually has a devious side and is competitive against her modeling rivals.

Mai is Toh's adoptive guardian, officially known as his "grandmother", and the CEO of the popular brand Aphro I Dite. She is considered to be one of the top designers in the world and is highly respected by many people. She is a strict yet fair and friendly person with an eye for talent, having high hopes of Toh and recognizing Ikuto's talent enough to promote him to chief designer of "Aphro I Dite novice", one of the branches of her company.

Niinuma is an editor for the premier fashion magazine MODE JAPAN, having recently transferred from the literature department. Being timid, shy, and of short stature, Niinuma is insecure about her appearance and her ability to be fashionable, and initially has no interest in fashion. However, she becomes more interested in the fashion world after seeing the short Chiyuki modeling at Yanagida's first fashion show and develops a deep admiration of her, though she has yet to meet her in person.

Yuriko is the kind and loving mother of Ikuto, Honoka, Aoi, and Ichika. Ever since her husband died when her children were young, Yuriko has been the sole provider for her family and her tendency to overwork herself has led her to be hospitalized many times. Despite the hardships she endures, Yuriko remains positive for her children's sake and maintains a playful sense of humor, especially towards Ikuto. 

Honoka is the oldest daughter and second oldest child of the Tsumura family. Honoka is smart and spends most of her time studying, even attending a different school from the rest of her siblings and one day dreams of working overseas. However, taking care of her family takes up her attention, causing her grades to occasionally slip, and Honoka denies herself from going to college due to the family's financial situation. 

Aoi is the second younger sister of Ikuto and the third child of the Tsumura family. Aoi is talented at volleyball and has been scouted by top schools, though Aoi declines the offers due to the expensive tuition. Since Aoi's sport takes up her time, she does not help around the house as much as Ikuto or Honoka do, but she steps up when needed. Aoi prefers clothes that are easy to move in and Ikuto often makes often blue-colored clothes for her, which is Aoi's favorite color and the meaning of her name.

Ichika is Ikuto's five-year-old sister and the youngest child of the Tsumura family. Ichika deeply adores her older brother and the clothes he makes for her. Her favorite accessory is ribbons. She usually wears one in her hair, and the clothes Ikuto makes for her always have ribbons or ribbon patterns on them.

Mii is a long-time friend of Yanagida, whom she has a crush on and was her tutor when she was a teenager. She is the daughter of the famous architect, Yoshinori Sakuma, who is also a patron of Aphro I Dite.

Media

Manga
Smile Down the Runway, written and illustrated by Kotoba Inoya, was serialized in Kodansha's Weekly Shōnen Magazine from May 31, 2017 to July 14, 2021. Kodansha has collected its chapters into individual tankōbon volumes. Twenty-two volumes were released from September 15, 2017 to August 17, 2021.

Volume list

Anime
An anime television series adaptation was announced on September 16, 2019. The series was animated by Ezo'la and directed by Nobuyoshi Nagayama, with Touko Machida handling series composition, and Misaki Kaneko designing the characters. Shuji Katayama and Akinari Suzuki composed the music. It aired from January 11 to March 28, 2020 on the Animeism programming block on MBS, TBS, and BS-TBS. Ami Sakaguchi performed the series' opening theme song "LION", while J-JUN performed the series' ending theme song "Ray of Light". Funimation licensed the series for a SimulDub. In Southeast Asia and South Asia, Muse Communication licensed the series and streamed it on its Muse Asia YouTube channel.

Episode list

Novel
Smile Down the Runway received a novelization by Yūki Arisawa, titled , which covers the events of the first two volumes of the series. It was released on April 15, 2020.

Notes

References

External links
 

2020 anime television series debuts
Anime series based on manga
Animeism
Crunchyroll anime
Drama anime and manga
Ezo'la
Kodansha manga
Modeling-themed television series
Muse Communication
School life in anime and manga
Shōnen manga
Slice of life anime and manga